Bobcat Stadium may refer to:

Bobcat Stadium (Montana State University), in Bozeman, Montana
Bobcat Stadium (Texas State), in San Marcos, Texas

See also
Wildcat Stadium (disambiguation)